Anders Patrik Jerksten (born 19 July 1974), also known as Patrik J., Patrik J. Sten or Pat Power, is a Swedish sound engineer and heavy metal drummer for Passenger, The Fifth Sun, and Dream Evil. He has worked extensively in the famous Studio Fredman and has engineering, mixing and production credits for many heavy metal bands such as Dimmu Borgir, The Haunted, Firewind, Nightrage, Darkest Hour and Susperia.

In 2006 he was invited into the ranks of Dream Evil, the heavy/power metal band featuring his Studio Fredman colleague Fredrik Nordström, as the replacement for their departed drummer Snowy Shaw.

Credits
"Cranking the Sirens" from Figure Number Five by Soilwork (musical composition)

References

External links
Dream Evil
Studio Fredman
The Fifth Sun

Swedish record producers
Swedish heavy metal drummers
Living people
1974 births
Dream Evil members
21st-century drummers
Passenger (Swedish band) members